What You Hear Is What You Get (subtitled The Best of Bad Company Live) is a live album by hard rock band Bad Company, with Brian Howe in place of Paul Rodgers as lead vocalist. Released in 1993, the album covers the 1992 U.S tour, with much of the recording done at various California dates.  The band's introduction was done by Ralphs' guitar technician (at that time), Gary Gilmore.

Track listing
 How About That (Brian Howe, Terry Thomas) – 5:31			
 Holy Water (Howe, Thomas) – 4:27 		
 Rock 'n' Roll Fantasy (Paul Rodgers) – 3:11 		
 If You Needed Somebody (Howe, Thomas) – 5:12 		
 Here Comes Trouble (Howe, Thomas) – 4:00 			
 Ready for Love (Mick Ralphs) – 5:25 			 	
 Shooting Star (Rodgers) – 6:28 				
 No Smoke Without a Fire (Howe, Thomas) – 5:03 			
 Feel Like Makin' Love (Ralphs, Rodgers) – 5:45 				
 Take This Town (Howe, Thomas) – 5:15 				
 Movin' On (Ralphs) – 3:20			
 Good Lovin' Gone Bad (Ralphs) – 3:49 				
 Fist Full of Blisters (Simon Kirke) – 1:00			
 Can't Get Enough (Ralphs) – 4:37 			
 Bad Company (Kirke, Rodgers) – 8:15

Personnel
 Brian Howe – lead vocals, saxophone
 Mick Ralphs – lead guitar, keyboards, backing vocals
 Dave Colwell – rhythm guitar, backing vocals
 Rick Wills – bass, backing vocals
 Simon Kirke – drums, backing vocals

Production 
 Simon Kirke – production 
 Ted Jensen – mastering
 Dave Natale – recording engineer
 John Seymour – assistant engineer
 Dave Wittman – engineer, mixing

References

External links 
 Bad Company - The Best of Bad Company Live... What You Hear Is What You Get (1993) album credits, releases & user reviews at AllMusic
 Bad Company - The Best of Bad Company Live... What You Hear Is What You Get (1993) album releases & credits at Discogs
 Bad Company - The Best of Bad Company Live... What You Hear Is What You Get (1993) album to be listened as stream on Spotify

Bad Company compilation albums
1993 live albums
Atlantic Records live albums